B. M. Higginson Jr. was the American national clay pigeon shooting champion in 1912. He was a Harvard University graduate and a member of the New York Athletic Club. Coming in second in 1912 was the 1905 champion John H. Hendrickson.

References

American male sport shooters
Trap and double trap shooters
Harvard University alumni
Year of birth missing
Year of death missing